St. George the Martyr Church, Kaunas is a Roman Catholic church in the Old Town of  Kaunas, Lithuania, which stands in front of the Kaunas Castle. It is a prominent example of Gothic architecture in Lithuania. The church was heavily damaged during the Napoleonic Wars and most recently during the occupation of the Baltic states when the church was converted into a medicine warehouse.

History

Its history began in 1471 when Stanislovas Sendzivojevičius, the Court Marshall of the Grand Duchy of Lithuania, donated a plot of land on the outskirts of Kaunas and Ivaška Viaževičius, the Elder of Kaunas, agreed to fund the building of a wooden church and an adjacent monastery for the Bernardine monks. Two decades later it was decided to re-build the church and the monastery in a Brick Gothic style. The construction began in 1492 and ended in 1502. It was built roughly at the same time as the St. Ann and the Bernardine churches in Vilnius. All three churches were most likely built by the same famed architect from Danzig, Michael Enkinger.

References

Buildings and structures completed in 1487
15th-century Roman Catholic church buildings in Lithuania
Roman Catholic churches in Kaunas
Brick Gothic
Gothic architecture in Lithuania